Galliano may refer to:

Galliano (liqueur), a liqueur
Galliano (surname)
Galliano (band), 1980s–1990s UK acid jazz/jazz funk/dance band
Galliano, a subdivision of Cantù, Italy
Galliano, Louisiana, United States
Banco Galliano, also Galliano's Bank, a bank that operated in Gibraltar from 1855 to 1987

See also
Galiano (disambiguation)
Gagliano (disambiguation)
Galeano (disambiguation)